Pollenia nigrita is a species of cluster fly in the family Polleniidae.

Distribution
Australia.

References

Polleniidae
Insects described in 1936
Taxa named by John Russell Malloch
Diptera of Australasia